The Tofangchi-aghasi, also spelled Tufangchi-aqasi, and otherwise known as the Tofangchi-bashi, was the commander of the Safavid Empire's musketeer corps. The tofangchi-aghasi was assisted by numerous officers, i.e. minbashis, yuzbashis, dahbashis, as well as an administrative staff (i.e. vizier, mostoufi). Though the tofangchi-aghasi was considered to be a high-ranking office on paper, de facto, it was one of the lowest on the "military totem-pole"  compared to the other commanding offices. Nevertheless, the post was generally held by scions of noble families.

List of Tofangchi-aghasis

Reign of Ismail I
 Mirza Shah Hosein (1516)

Reign of Tahmasp I
 Kur Hasan (1529)
 ?
 Mir Saheb-e Qoshun (1576)

Reign of Ismail II
 Mir Saheb-e Qoshun (1576)
 ?

Reign of Mohammad Khodabanda
 ?

Reign of Abbas I
 Esma'il Beg (1614-1615)
 Zaman Beg (1629)

Reign of Shah Safi
 Rostam Beg (1630)
 Mir Fatteh Qumesheh'i (1634-1635)
 Aqa Taher (1635-1643)

Reign of Abbas II
 Aqa Taher (1635-1643)
 Qalander Soltan Chuleh (1643-1661)
 Budaq Soltan (1661-1668)

Reign of Suleiman I
 Budaq Soltan (1661-1668)
 Sheikh 'Ali Khan Zanganeh (1668-1669)
 Abbas Beg Zanganeh (1669-1670)
 Kaykhosrow Khan (1670-1674)
 Hajji 'Ali Khan Zanganeh (1674-1691)
 Eshaq Khan (?)

Reign of Sultan Husayn
 Eshaq Khan (?)
 Musa Khan (1711-1715)
 Hosein Ali Khan (1717-1720)
 Mohammad Ali Khan Mokri (1720-1722)

Reign of Tahmasp II
 Ahmad Khan (1723)
 Shahverdi Khan Cheshmkazik (1724)

Notes

Sources
 
 

Tofangchi-aghasi
Iranian military-related lists
Lists of office-holders in Iran